This is the list of players who have played for Bengaluru FC since its inception in 2013.

Current squad

First-team squad

List of players

Appearances and goals are for I-League and Indian Super League  matches only.
Players are listed according to the date of their first team debut for the club. Only players with at least one appearance are included.

Statistics correct as of match played 10 March 2021

Table headers
 Nationality – If a player played international football, the country/countries he played for are shown. Otherwise, the player's nationality is given as their country of birth.
 Bengaluru FC career – The year of the player's first appearance for Bengaluru FC to the year of his last appearance.
 Starts – The number of games started.
 Sub – The number of games played as a substitute.
 Total – The total number of games played, both as a starter and as a substitute.

Club captains
Sunil Chhetri is Bengaluru FC's first and current captain.

Notes
 A utility player is one who is considered to play in more than one position.

References

Bengaluru FC-related lists
Bengaluru FC players
Bengaluru
Association football player non-biographical articles